Dan Bahat (born 1938) is an Israeli archaeologist especially known for his excavations in Jerusalem , particularly at the Western Wall tunnels.

Biography
Dan Bahat was born in Poland to parents who were citizens of Mandatory Palestine. The family moved to Tel Aviv in 1939 and became Israeli citizens in 1952.  He served in the IDF from 1956 to 1958. In 1964 he gained a Bachelor's degree in archaeology and Jewish history at the Hebrew University of Jerusalem. He finished his master's degree in 1978. In 1990 he obtained the PhD degree from the Hebrew University on the topic "Topography and Toponymy of Crusader Jerusalem" under the supervision of Joshua Prawer.

Academic and archaeology career
Between 1963 and 1990 Bahat was employed by the Israel Government's Department of Antiquities, Ministry of Culture and Education, including as the District Archeologist of Jerusalem.

He taught until 2004 at Bar-Ilan University, Israel, and he is currently teaching at St. Michael College, University of Toronto, Canada.

Archaeological projects
In January 1992, Dan Bahat published the IAA's archaeological finding of the Western Stone, the largest ashlar stone found to date in Israel, at ca. 10 – 12 metres above the base of the Temple Mount's western wall enclosure. The stone measures  in length, presumably  in depth,  in height, and is estimated at weighing ca. 517 tonnes (570 short tons), the world’s third largest block of stone used in building.

Bahat led the two-season dig at Tel Yavne, unearthing remains of the Crusader castle of the Ibelin family.

Published works

References

1938 births
Hebrew University of Jerusalem alumni
Israeli archaeologists
Living people
Polish emigrants to Mandatory Palestine